The Appalachina sayana, also known as the Spike-lip Crater, is a species of small, air-breathing, land snails, terrestrial pulmonate gastropod molluscs in the family Polygyridae.

Distribution and conservation status 
This species lives in Ontario, Quebec, New Brunswick and in Nova Scotia in Canada and was assessed as Not at Risk by the Committee on the Status of Endangered Wildlife in Canada (COSEWIC).

References

Polygyridae
Gastropods described in 1906